Mircea Puta (February 1, 1950 —July 26, 2007) was a Romanian mathematician, the 1983 recipient of the Simion Stoilow Prize of the Romanian Academy. He is the author of over 190 articles and two books.

Puta started his undergraduate studies at West University of Timișoara in 1969, graduating in 1974. He earned his Ph.D. degree in 1979, under the supervision of Dan Papuc, after which he joined the faculty at his alma mater, becoming a Professor in 1993.

Bibliography

References

1950 births
2007 deaths
20th-century Romanian mathematicians
21st-century Romanian mathematicians
West University of Timișoara alumni
Dynamical systems theorists